Glendale is a census-designated place located in Spartanburg County in the U.S. State of South Carolina. According to the 2010 United States Census, the population was 307.

History
A post office called Glendale has been in operation since 1878. The community's chief industry was a cotton mill.

The Bivings-Converse House was listed on the National Register of Historic Places in 1995.

Geography
Glendale is located at  (34.945078, -81.836373). These coordinates place the CDP to the east of the City of Spartanburg.

According to the United States Census Bureau, the CDP has a total area of 0.212  square miles (0.549 km), all land.

Demographics

References

Census-designated places in Spartanburg County, South Carolina
Census-designated places in South Carolina